Gosaikunda, also spelled Gosainkunda, is an alpine freshwater oligotrophic lake in Nepal's Langtang National Park, located at an elevation of  in the Rasuwa District with a surface of .

The lake melts to form the Trishuli River; it remains frozen for six months in winter October to June. There are 108 lakes in the vicinity.

Religious significance 

The Gosaikunda area has been delineated as a religious site. Hindu mythology attributes Gosaikunda as the abode of the Hindu deities Shiva and Gauri. The Hindu scriptures Bhagavata Purana, Vishnu Purana and the epics Ramayana and Mahabharata refer to Samudra manthan, which is directly related to the origin of Gosaikunda. Its waters are considered holy and of particular significance during the Gangadashahara and the Janai Purnima festivals when thousands of pilgrims from Nepal and India visit the area.

According to legend the spring that feeds the pond in the Kumbheshwar temple complex in Patan is connected to Gosaikunda. Therefore, those who cannot make the long journey to the lake, visit Kumbeshwar Pokhari instead.

Gosaikunda in popular culture 
Among the Newars Gosaikunda is known as Silu. As such it is the subject of a song and a 1987 film inspired by that song.

References

External links 

 The Ramsar Convention on Wetlands: The Annotated Ramsar List of Nepal

Lakes of Bagmati Province
Ramsar sites in Nepal
Protected areas established in 2007
Hindu pilgrimage sites in Nepal
Sacred lakes
Lakes of Nepal